John Warren, Jr. (born January 7, 1947) is a retired American professional basketball player. He was a 6'3" guard–forward.

Born in Sparta, Georgia, Warren attended Far Rockaway High School in Queens, New York, and played college basketball at St. John's University from 1966 to 1969. He scored 1,306 points in 84 games and was considered his team's strongest defender. The St. John's basketball media guide says that Warren "was perhaps St. John’s most complete player".

After his collegiate career, Warren played five seasons (1969–1974) in the National Basketball Association as a member of the New York Knicks and Cleveland Cavaliers.  He averaged 6.0 points per game and won a league championship with New York in 1970. He currently holds the record for most field goals made without a miss in Cleveland Cavaliers history (12 for 12).

While playing for the Cavaliers on December 9, 1970, Warren mistakenly scored for the Portland Trail Blazers on a fast break lay-up at the beginning of the fourth quarter. Leroy Ellis of Portland received credit for the points, although he had tried to block the shot.

Warren was elected to the St. John's Hall of Fame in 1986. He currently resides in New York with his wife, Rhia.  He has two children, John III and Joy.

External links

References

1947 births
Living people
Basketball players from Georgia (U.S. state)
Cleveland Cavaliers expansion draft picks
Cleveland Cavaliers players
Far Rockaway High School alumni
New York Knicks draft picks
New York Knicks players
People from Sparta, Georgia
Shooting guards
Small forwards
Sportspeople from Queens, New York
Basketball players from New York City
St. John's Red Storm men's basketball players
American men's basketball players